Encyclopedia Titanica is an online reference work containing extensive and constantly updated information on the . The website, a nonprofit endeavor, is a database of passenger and crew biographies, deck plans, and articles submitted by historians or Titanic enthusiasts. In 1999, The New York Times noted that the site "may be the most comprehensive Titanic site", based on its content including passenger lists and ship plans. The Chicago Tribune called it "a marvelously detailed Internet site."

History
Encyclopedia Titanica was founded by Philip Hind. The website first went on-line September 1996. By March 1999, the website had received 600,000 hits.

Content
Encyclopedia Titanica contains a wide range of information about the ship, her passengers and a variety of related subjects.  Each passenger and crew member has a separate page containing at least basis biographical data, and many of these contain detailed biographies, photographs and contemporary news articles.  The site also contains original research by professional and amateur Titanic historians from all parts of the world.

Encyclopedia Titanica also contains an active message board with (as of November 2012) over 11,700 members and 300,000 messages. Among the topics of discussion on the message board are the following:

Passenger Research
Cabin Numbers
Collision and Sinking Theories
Crew Research
Discovery, Salvage and Exploration
The Gilded Age
Life on Board
Lost and Saved

Ships that may have stood still
Construction and Design
Titanic Art, Photography and Music
Titanic Books
Titanic Movies
Titanic on TV
Other Ships and Shipwrecks

References

External links
Encyclopedia Titanica

RMS Titanic
Online encyclopedias
Internet properties established in 1996
Internet forums
20th-century encyclopedias